Muhammad Failee bin Mohamad Ghazli (born 5 September 1987) is a Malaysian footballer who plays as a forward for MOF F.C. in the Malaysia FAM League.

He started his footballing career with Penang FA, before joining another Penang team USM FC in early 2011. He joined Perak on loan from USM FC in August 2011 for Perak's Malaysia Cup campaign, wearing number 31. After scoring 4 goal in 6 matches at the competition's group stage, and 1 goal in 2 knock-out matches, Failee have been rewarded with a permanent move to Perak for the 2012 Malaysia Super League season. He also had his squad number changed to 12. After spending one season with Sime Darby for 2014 season, Failee returns to Penang FA for the 2015 season to help Penang FA for their fight to win promotion for the Malaysia Super League. Failee moves to FAM League team MOF F.C. for the 2018 season.

His younger brother Faizat Ghazli is also a footballer.

Honours

Club
Penang
Malaysia Premier League: Promotion 2015

References

External links
 

1987 births
Living people
Malaysian people of Malay descent
Malaysian footballers
Penang F.C. players
Perak F.C. players
People from Perak
Association football forwards